Events in the year 1955 in Finland.

Establishments

Evia Oyj.
Finnish Cup.

Events
23 December – The first film adaptation of Väinö Linna's novel The Unknown Soldier, directed by Edvin Laine, was premiered.

Births

15 August - Anne Marie Pohtamo.
4 November - Matti Vanhanen.
19 November - Reima Salonen.
15 December - Pentti Kokkonen.

References

 
1950s in Finland
Years of the 20th century in Finland
Finland
Finland